Basket Zaragoza 2002 S.A.D., more commonly referred to as Basket Zaragoza  and as Casademont Zaragoza for sponsorship reasons, is a professional basketball club based in Zaragoza, Spain. The team plays in the Liga ACB. Their home arena is the Pabellón Príncipe Felipe.

History 
Basket Zaragoza was founded in 2002 with the aim of giving the city of Zaragoza back to the Spanish basketball elite league, after old CB Zaragoza left the Liga ACB on 1996. It started playing on LEB, after taking the place belonging to CB Coruña.

CAI Zaragoza spent five hard years on LEB league before reaching Liga ACB for the first time. The team had to overcome a relegation playoff in its first season against CB Ciudad de Huelva, and four consecutive failed promotion playoffs against CB Granada, CB Murcia and Baloncesto León twice.

Finally, CAI Zaragoza got promoted to Liga ACB after winning the title of the 2007–08 season, but its first participation on it was a total failure. CAI Zaragoza got immediately relegated, after being defeated in the last day by CB Murcia. Nevertheless, the team arranged returned to Liga ACB on the next season after the arrival of homegrown coach José Luis Abós.

Under Abos, CAI Zaragoza established on the top Spanish basketball competition; in the 2012–13 season, they qualifying for the first time to the Copa del Rey and reached the ACB semifinals in their first participation in the play-offs for the title. This success allowed CAI Zaragoza to make their debut in European competitions by playing the EuroCup Basketball during three consecutive seasons, reaching the Last 16 stage in the 2015–16 season.

Nevertheless, after Abós's untimely death in 2014, the team struggled in the national competition, and went from reaching the play-offs to barely avoiding relegation. In 2016, after 14 years with CAI, the club changed the sponsorship naming to Tecnyconta Zaragoza.

In the 2018-19 ACB season, under Porfirio Fisac's coaching and after a profound change in their roster, Tecnyconta Zaragoza returned to the ACB play-off and reached the semifinals for the second time in their history.

On 15 June 2020, Basket Zaragoza created the women's team by integrating the professional team of Stadium Casablanca.

Logos

Players

Current roster

Depth chart

Season by season

Honours

National leagues 
2nd division championships: (2)
LEB: (2) 2008, 2010
Copa Príncipe de Asturias: (1)
2004
Copa Aragón: (2)
2018, 2019

European competition
Basketball Champions League
Third place: 2020–21

Individual awards 
Copa Príncipe de Asturias MVP
 Matías Lescano – 2004
Basketball Champions League Best Young Player
 Carlos Alocén – 2020

Players database 
Updated as of the end of the 2014–15 season

Coaches database

Women's team 
Since 2020, Basket Zaragoza has also a women's team. It was created after integrating Stadium Casablanca into the structure of the club. Basket Zaragoza joined to Liga Femenina, instead of Stadium Casablanca which joined to Liga Femenina 2 as a reserve team.

Season by season

References

External links 
 Official website
 Basket Zaragoza at ACB.com 

Basketball teams in Aragon
Sport in Zaragoza
Basketball teams established in 2002
Liga ACB teams